Mariam Budia (born March 14, 1970, in Logroño (La Rioja), Spain) Spanish writer, researcher, and playwright.

Biography 
Mariam Budia has a doctorate in Spanish Studies in the "Theory, History and Practice of Drama" from the University of Alcalá. She graduated in Drama at the Royal Superior Drama School, RESAD, and has diplomas of honor in Music from the La Rioja Professional Music Conservatory.

She has worked as a professor at Korea University teaching Spanish Literature, where she got Excellent Teaching Awards, as well as a professor at Kobe City University of Foreign Studies, Japan.

In her role as a writer, she stands out in the search for new languages to free her characters from their natural environment. Some of her works have been translated into English  and Korean.

She also makes collaborations in national magazines and newspapers and radio stations as well.

Literary works 
Among her published work we can list:
 Historias del comediante fiel   
 Teatro del desarraigo (1)   
 Teatro del desarraigo (2)   
 Teatro del desarraigo (3) 
 Antología de comedia y humor, (Budia, et al.) Ediciones Irreverentes, Madrid.  
 El tamaño no importa V, (Budia, et al.) Ediciones Antígona - AAT, Madrid.  
 Al Soslayo
 Cancán del Moulin
 La mujer Sakura written in Japan.
 Prohibido autolesionarse
 Carlaño

Dramatizations of her works 
Among others:
 ¿Dentro del matrimonio?, in  Fernando de Rojas Theatre, Madrid. Director: Julián Quintanilla, Actress: Loles León.
 La indignación de Sinforoso, in XV Salón Internacional del Libro Teatral, Madrid. Director: Quino Falero, Actors: Manuel Galiana and Sofía Valero.
 La chocolatina, in XXII Salón Internacional del Libro Teatral, Madrid. Director: Fernando Sansegundo, Actress: Huichi Chiu.
 Cerrad las ventanas, in Fernando de Rojas Theatre, Madrid. Director: Pedro Víllora, Actress: María Luisa Merlo.

Research 
As a researcher, among others: 
 "Aproximación a los elementos formales y filosóficos de Dragón, obra inconclusa de García Lorca" in Estudios Hispánicos, No. 60, Seoul: Korean Association of Hispanists. :
 "Comedia sin título de García Lorca: ensayo dramatizado para una didáctica inconclusa" in The Korean Journal of Hispanic Studies, Seoul: Korea University. 
 "Aproximación a las estrategias creativas en Así que pasen cinco años: tiempo absoluto y subconsciente" in Teatro (Revista de Estudios Escénicos), No. 21, Madrid: Atheneum of Madrid- University of Alcalá.

Studies of her plays
 Prof. Pérez Jiménez, Manuel (UAH), Concepto de desarraigo y polimorfismo estético, in Digital Library University of Alcalá.
 Prof. Alba Peinado, Alba (UNED), Prohibido autolesionarse: poéticas del desarraigo, in Leer Teatro No. 5.
 Prof. Pérez Jiménez, Manuel (UAH), Del desarraigo a la esperanza, un teatro de nuestro tiempo, in Digital Library University of Alcalá.

References 

1970 births
Living people
Spanish dramatists and playwrights
Women dramatists and playwrights
21st-century dramatists and playwrights
21st-century Spanish women writers
21st-century Spanish writers
University of Alcalá alumni
Academic staff of Korea University
People from Logroño